Ivan Oh is a Malaysian karateka. At the 2019 Southeast Asian Games, he won the gold medal in the men's team kata event, alongside Emmanuel Leong and Thomson Hoe. He is coached by Ku Jin Keat who won the gold medal in the men's kata event at the 2010 Asian Games.

In 2019, he also won the silver medal in the men's team kata event at the 2019 Asian Karate Championships held in Tashkent, Uzbekistan.

Achievements

References 

Living people
Year of birth missing (living people)
Place of birth missing (living people)
Malaysian male karateka
Southeast Asian Games gold medalists for Malaysia
Southeast Asian Games medalists in karate
Competitors at the 2019 Southeast Asian Games
Competitors at the 2021 Southeast Asian Games
21st-century Malaysian people